Brandolini is an Italian surname. Notable people with the surname include:

Aureliano Brandolini (1927–2008), Italian agronomist and development cooperation scholar
Aurelio Lippo Brandolini (1454?–1497), Italian humanist and political theorist 
Coco Brandolini d'Adda (born 1979), Italian fashion editor and executive
Cristiana Brandolini d'Adda (born 1927), Italian socialite
Bianca Brandolini d’Adda (born 1987), Italian fashion model, actress and socialite
Fernando Brandolini (1932–1987), Italian professional racing cyclist
Georgina Brandolini d'Adda (born 1949), French-Brazilian fashion executive
Luca Brandolini (born 1933), Italian prelate of the Roman Catholic Church 
Marie Brandolini d'Adda (1963-2013), French-Italian glass maker
Muriel Brandolini, French-Vietnamese interior designer
 Alberto Brandolini, data scientist and proponent of Brandolini's Law

Italian-language surnames